Rotana Masriya was an Egyptian free-to-air satellite TV general entertainment unencrypted channel that was owned by Rotana Group network. It was launched on 21 May 2011, after the Egyptian uprising in January 2011. The channel won the award of The Best Youth Show in the whole Arabic speaking world in the second year of Cairo's Radio and TV Mondial. The channel got a wide international coverage after featuring a birthday party which appeared like a marriage of two men in Egypt, where same-sex relationships are not technically illegal but are nevertheless punishable in practice.

By 2017, it renamed itself Rotana Drama in order to turn into broadcasting Arab and Turkish drama works.

References

External links

Television stations in Egypt
Arabic-language television stations
Direct broadcast satellite services
Television channels and stations established in 2011
2011 establishments in Egypt